Quinton catheters are non-tunneled central line catheters, which are often used for acute (i.e. temporary) access for hemodialysis or infusion of medicine when peripheral IV access is not possible (e.g. small vessel caliber, extensive burn injuries). They can also be used to infuse liquids which cause peripheral blood vessel irritation, directly into the vena cavae where they are immediately diluted.

The Quinton catheter is named after Wayne Everett Quinton (1921–2015) who was a bioengineer at the University of Washington. Quinton was instrumental in developing a way of delivering kidney dialysis to hundreds of thousands of patients in kidney failure. He worked with doctors Belding Scribner and David Dillard to develop a surgically implanted device in an artery that allows patients with kidney failure to receive regular dialysis. A Quinton catheter has been used to deliver chronic dialysis since the mid-1980s.

See also

Central venous catheter

References

Catheters